Abdulrahman Mohamed Mohamed (Arabic:عبد الرحمن محمد محمد) (born 4 December 2002) is a Qatari footballer. He currently plays as a midfielder for Al-Wakrah.

Career
Abdulrahman Mohamed started his career at Al-Wakrah and is a product of the Al-Wakrah's youth system. On 22 December 2019, Abdulrahman Mohamed made his professional debut for Al-Wakrah against Al-Rayyan in the Pro League, replacing Riadh Mekideche .

References

External links

2002 births
Living people
Qatari footballers
Al-Wakrah SC players
Qatar Stars League players
Association football midfielders
Place of birth missing (living people)